Güner is a Turkish unisex given name and surname. Notable people with the name include:

Given name

 Güner Ureya (born 1973), Kosovar diplomat

Surname
 Agah Oktay Güner (born 1937), Turkish journalist and politician 
 Aslıhan Güner (born 1984), Turkish actress
 Berkant Güner (born 1998), Turkish football player
 Çetin Güner (born 1977), Turkish-German football player
 Fuat Güner (born 1948), Turkish pop musician
 İlayda Güner (born 1999), Turkish basketball player

See also
 Guner, also Romanized as Gūner, also known as Gonar, a village in Senderk Rural District, Senderk District, Minab County, Hormozgan Province, Iran

Turkish unisex given names
Surnames of Turkish origin